Ndiouga Dieng (6 June 1947 – 10 November 2016) was a Senegalese singer and one of the original vocalists of Orchestra Baobab, who died in 2016 after a prolonged illness.

References 

2016 deaths
20th-century Senegalese male singers
1947 births